Zoroaster (Zōroástrēs) is the Greek form of the Persian Zarathustra, founder of Zoroastrianism.

Zoroaster may also refer to:
 Zoroaster da Peretola ( – 1520), friend and collaborator of Leonardo Da Vinci
 Zoroaster (band), a sludge metal band from Atlanta, Georgia
 Zoroaster (album), a 1995 album by Acid King
 Zoroaster (1818 ship), a ship built at Kingston upon Hull in 1818 whose crew mutinied in 1836
 Zoroaster (sea star), genus of echinoderms – see Zoroasteridae

See also
 Zarathustra (disambiguation)